Stikine is a provincial electoral district in British Columbia, Canada established by the Electoral Districts Act, 2008.  It came into effect upon the dissolution of the BC Legislature in April 2009, and was first contested in the 2009 provincial election, and most recently in the 2020 provincial election.

Geography

As of the 2020 provincial election, Stikine comprises the entire Stikine Region, the northern portion of the Regional District of Kitimat-Stikine and a small area of the Regional District of Bulkley-Nechako containing the communities of Smithers and Telkwa. Located in northwestern British Columbia the electoral district is bordered by the Yukon to the north and Alaska, United States to the west. Other communities in the electoral district consist of New Hazelton, Stewart and Atlin.

History 
This electoral district has elected the following Members of Legislative Assembly:

Election results

References

British Columbia provincial electoral districts
Smithers, British Columbia